The name Malakas has been used for four tropical cyclones in the western north Pacific Ocean. The name was contributed by the Philippines and is a Filipino word meaning 'strong' or 'powerful'.

 Tropical Storm Malakas (2004) (T0414, 17W) – weak tropical storm which drifted out to sea
 Typhoon Malakas (2010) (T1012, 13W) – strong Category 2 typhoon which stayed out to sea
 Typhoon Malakas (2016) (T1616, 18W, Gener) – powerful Category 4 typhoon which impacted Taiwan and Japan, killing 1 person
 Typhoon Malakas (2022) (T2201, 02W, Basyang) – extremely large early-season Category 4 typhoon which remained out to sea

References

Pacific typhoon set index articles